Konstantine Darsania (born 29 May 1984) is a Georgian footballer who currently is a free agent.

References

Footballers from Georgia (country)
Expatriate footballers from Georgia (country)
First Professional Football League (Bulgaria) players
PFC Cherno More Varna players
Ayia Napa FC players
FC Lokomotivi Tbilisi players
Expatriate footballers in Bulgaria
Expatriate footballers in Cyprus
1984 births
Living people
Association football defenders